Stripped is a 2014 documentary film about comic strips and their transition from the failing newspaper industry to the web.  Work on Stripped began in 2010. The film's original concept was to make a documentary about cartoonists in their studios.

Stripped features interviews with over 70 comic creators, who discuss their trade and its prospects in the 21st century.  Interviewee Bill Watterson created the poster for Stripped, his first published art since ending Calvin and Hobbes in 1995.  The film was crowdfunded through Kickstarter, and was released on the iTunes Store on April 1, 2014.

Interviewees
 

 Jean Schulz, widow of Charles M. Schulz (Peanuts, 1950–2000)
 Mort Walker (Beetle Bailey, 1950–)
 Jeff Keane (The Family Circus, 1960–)
 Cathy Guisewite (Cathy, 1976–2010)
 Jim Davis (Garfield, 1978–)
 Bill Watterson (Calvin and Hobbes, 1985–1995)
 Greg Evans (Luann, 1985–)
 Bill Amend (FoxTrot, 1988–) 

 Jerry Holkins (Penny Arcade, 1998–)
 Mike Krahulik (Penny Arcade, 1998–)
 Jeph Jacques (Questionable Content, 2003–)
 Richard Thompson (Cul de Sac, 2004–2012)
 Karl Kerschl (The Abominable Charles Christopher, 2007–)
 Kate Beaton (Hark! A Vagrant, 2008–)
 Matthew Inman (The Oatmeal, 2009–)

References

External links

2014 documentary films
American documentary films
Documentary films about comics
2014 films
Documentary films about the Internet
Kickstarter-funded documentaries
2010s English-language films
2010s American films